Aaron Jarvis may refer to:

 Aaron Jarvis (rugby union) (born 1986), Wales rugby union player
 Aaron Jarvis (footballer) (born 1998), English footballer